Saltängen is a part of Norrköping, Sweden.

The Swedish Maritime Administration and the Swedish Prison and Probation Service are located in Saltängen.

Norrköping